Forrest is a surname of English and Scottish origins. This name derives from the Old French "forest" (Latin "foreste(m)", a derivative of "foris" meaning "outside"). The word was introduced by the Normans, and referred to a Royal Forest. Variants include Forest, De Forest, De Forrest, DeForest and DeForrest. Forrest is associated with Clan Forrester and Clan Douglas.
Variants of the name are first recorded in England in the early 13th century. Hugh de Foresta is mentioned in the Curia Regis rolls in 1204. There was a Templar knight, Guy de Foresta, who was Master of the Temple, n 1290–1294. One Adam ate forest appears in the Subsidy Rolls of Kent in 1300.
In Scotland the name is first mentioned in the Morton Register of 1376 where William de Forest is found in Newlands, Scottish Borders. Morgan de Forest is found in Aberdeen in 1402, and a William of Forest was physician to the Queen in 1430. In 1505 John Forrest is recorded as succeeding his father John as owner of Gamelshiel castle in East Lothian. 
The name is first recorded in Ireland in 1566 where Piers Forest was a merchant in Cork.
The Forrest baronets of Comiston in Edinburgh had a coat of arms containing three oak trees and the motto "vivunt dum virent" (they live while green). The influential pioneer family of Western Australia also have this motto and similar arms in their history.

Notable people 
Alex Forrest (footballer), Scottish footballer
Alexander Forrest, Australian explorer and politician
Andrew Forrest, Australian mining entrepreneur
Anne Marie Forrest, Irish writer
Anthony Alexander Forrest, Australian rules footballer and soldier
 April Forrest, singer in girlgroup Jada 
Arthur J. Forrest, Medal of Honor recipient
Barbara Forrest, philosopher and critic of intelligent design
Catriona Forrest, Scottish field hockey player
Chuck Forrest, American Jeopardy! champion
Craig Forrest, Canadian soccer/football player
Dan Forrest, American composer
Darrick Forrest (born 1999), American football player
David Forrest (disambiguation), multiple people
Edwin Forrest, American actor
Emmett Forrest (1927–2013), American collector and museum founder
Eric Forrest, bass guitarist
Frederic Forrest, American actor
French Forrest, American Confederate naval officer
George Forrest, several people
Hal Forrest, American comics artist
Helen Forrest, American big band singer
Ina Forrest, Canadian wheelchair curler
James Forrest (disambiguation), several people
Jason Forrest, electronic music producer
Jim Forrest, Scottish curler, European champion
John Forrest (disambiguation), several people
 Joseph King Cummins Forrest, a founder of the Chicago Tribune
J.D. Forrest, American ice hockey player
Katherine V. Forrest, American writer
Kevin Forrest, American soccer player
Linn A. Forrest, American architect
Margaret Forrest, wife of John Forrest the explorer
Maureen Milgram Forrest (1938–2013), British businesswoman
Nathan Bedford Forrest, Confederate general, first Grand Wizard of the Ku Klux Klan
Nathan Bedford Forrest III, American general
Nita Forrest (1926–1996), Canadian artist
Paula Forrest, Australian actress
Peter Forrest, Australian cricketer
Ray Forrest, American radio announcer
Ruth Forrest, Tasmanian politician
Sally Forrest, American actress
Sam Forrest, singer and guitarist
Steve Forrest (actor) (1925–2013), American actor
Steve Forrest (musician), rock music drummer
Ted Forrest, American poker player
Thomas Forrest (politician), American politician
Thomas Forrest, Esq (1572–1641), Virginia Company Financier, husband of the first woman to come to America in 1608
Tom Forrest, American football player
Uriah Forrest (1746–1805), Revolutionary War hero, U.S. Congressman for Maryland, and descendant of Thomas Forrest, Esq
Vernon Forrest (1971–2009), American boxer
William Forrest (1902–1989), an American film actor
William Forrest (disambiguation), several people

Fictional characters 

Duke Forrest, a character from the M*A*S*H novels
Admiral Maxwell Forrest, a recurring character on Star Trek: Enterprise
Emmett Forrest, Elle Woods’ love interest in the musical adaptation of the film Legally Blonde. In the movie, his last name is Richmond instead.

See also
Forest (disambiguation)

English-language surnames
Scottish surnames
English toponymic surnames

fr:Forrest#Patronyme